Laser is a genus of flowering plant in the family Apiaceae, native from Europe to northern Iran. The genus was first described in 1799.

Species
, Plants of the World Online accepted the following species:
Laser affine (Ledeb.) Wojew. & Spalik
Laser archangelica (Wulfen) Spalik & Wojew.
Laser carduchorum (Hedge & Lamond) Wojew. & Spalik
Laser involucratum (Pall. ex Schult.) Spalik & Wojew.
Laser panjutinii (Manden. & Schischk.) Banasiak, Wojew. & Spalik
Laser stevenii (Fisch. & Trautv.) Wojew. & Spalik
Laser trilobum (L.) Borkh.

References

Apioideae
Apioideae genera